John Henry O'Hara (January 31, 1905 – April 11, 1970) was one of America's most prolific writers of short stories, credited with helping to invent The New Yorker magazine short story style. He became a best-selling novelist before the age of 30 with Appointment in Samarra and BUtterfield 8. While O'Hara's legacy as a writer is debated, his champions rank him highly among the under-appreciated and unjustly neglected major American writers of the 20th century. Few college students educated after O'Hara's death in 1970 have discovered him, chiefly because he refused to allow his work to be reprinted in anthologies used to teach literature at the college level.

"O’Hara may not have been the best story writer of the twentieth century, but he is the most addictive," wrote Lorin Stein, then editor-in-chief of the Paris Review, in a 2013 appreciation of O'Hara's work. Stein added, "You can binge on his collections the way some people binge on Mad Men, and for some of the same reasons. On the topics of class, sex, and alcohol—that is, the topics that mattered to him—his novels amount to a secret history of American life." His work stands out from that of his contemporary authors for its unvarnished realism.

O'Hara achieved substantial commercial success in the years after World War II,  when his fiction repeatedly appeared in Publishers Weekly's annual list of the top ten best-selling fiction works in the United States. These best sellers included A Rage to Live (1949), Ten North Frederick (1955), From the Terrace (1959), Ourselves to Know (1960), Sermons and Soda Water (1960) and Elizabeth Appleton (1963). Five of his works were adapted into popular films in the 1950s and 1960s.

Despite the popularity of these books, O'Hara accumulated detractors due to his outsized and easily bruised ego, alcoholic crankiness, long-held resentments and politically conservative views that were unfashionable in literary circles in the 1960s. After O'Hara's death, John Updike, a fan of O'Hara's writing, said that the prolific author "out-produced our capacity for appreciation; maybe now we can settle down and marvel at him all over again."

Early life and education
O'Hara was born in Pottsville, Pennsylvania to an affluent Irish-American family. Though his family lived among the gentry of eastern Pennsylvania during his childhood, O'Hara's Irish-Catholic background gave him the perspective of an outsider on the inside of WASP society, a theme he returned to in his writing again and again. He attended the secondary school Niagara Prep in Lewiston, New York, where he was named Class Poet for Class of 1924. His father died about that time, leaving him unable to afford to attend Yale, the college of his dreams. By all accounts, this fall in social status from a privileged life of a well-heeled doctor's family (including club memberships, riding and dance lessons, fancy cars in the barn, domestic servants in the house) to overnight insolvency afflicted O'Hara with status anxiety for the rest of his life, honing the cutting social class awareness that characterizes his work.

Brendan Gill, who worked with O'Hara at The New Yorker, claimed that O'Hara was nearly obsessed with a sense of social inferiority due to not having attended Yale. "People used to make fun of the fact that O'Hara wanted so desperately to have gone to Yale, but it was never a joke to O'Hara. It seemed... that there wasn't anything he didn't know about it in regard to college and prep-school matters." Hemingway once said someone should "start a bloody fund to send up a collection to send John O'Hara to Yale." As his literary acclaim grew, O'Hara yearned for an honorary degree from Yale, so much so that he even asked the university for it. According to Gill, Yale was unwilling to award the honor because O'Hara "asked for it."

Career and reputation
Initially, O'Hara worked as a reporter for various newspapers. Moving to New York City, he began to write short stories for magazines. During the early part of his career, he was also a film critic, a radio commentator and a press agent. In 1934, O'Hara published his first novel, Appointment in Samarra. Endorsing the novel, Ernest Hemingway wrote: "If you want to read a book by a man who knows exactly what he is writing about and has written it marvelously well, read Appointment in Samarra." O'Hara followed Samarra with BUtterfield 8, his roman à clef based upon the tragic, short life of flapper Starr Faithfull, whose mysterious death in 1931 became a tabloid sensation. Over four decades, O'Hara published novels, novellas, plays, screenplays and more than 400 short stories, the majority of them in The New Yorker. During World War II, he was a correspondent in the Pacific theater. After the war, he wrote screenplays and more novels, including Ten North Frederick, for which he won the 1956 National Book Award and From the Terrace (1958), which he considered his "greatest achievement as a novelist." Late in life, with his reputation established, he became a newspaper columnist. In his last decade, O'Hara created "a body of work of magnificent dimensions," wrote the novelist George V. Higgins, whose own trademark dialogue was influenced heavily by O'Hara's style. "Between 1960 and 1968," Higgins noted, O'Hara "published six novels, seven collections of short fiction, and some 137 terse and extended stories that all by themselves would supply credentials for a towering reputation in the world of perfect justice that he never did quite find."

Many of O'Hara's stories (and his later novels written in the 1950s) are set in Gibbsville, Pennsylvania, a barely fictionalized version of his home town of Pottsville, a small city in the anthracite region of the northeastern United States. He named Gibbsville for his friend and frequent editor at The New Yorker Wolcott Gibbs. Most of his other stories were set in New York or Hollywood.

O'Hara's short stories earned him his highest critical acclaim. He contributed more of them to The New Yorker than any other writer. He published seven volumes of stories in the final decade of his career while complaining that they took his time away from writing novels. "I had an apparently inexhaustible urge to express an unlimited supply of short story ideas. No writing has ever come more easily to me," he claimed. In the Library of America's collection of 60 of O'Hara's best stories, editor Charles McGrath praises them for their "sketchlike lightness and brevity... in which nothing necessarily 'happens' in the old-fashioned sense, but in which some crucial loss or discovery is revealed just by implication... a sense of speed and economy is just what makes the best of these stories so thrilling." Gill, who worked with O'Hara at The New Yorker, ranks him "among the greatest short-story writers in English, or in any other language" and credits him with helping "to invent what the world came to call The New Yorker short story." In the foreword to a collection published four years before his death, O'Hara declared, "No one writes them any better than I do." Two more volumes of his stories were published soon after his death.

Despite his popular success as a best-selling author, most of O'Hara's longer work is not held in as high regard by the literary establishment. Critic Benjamin Schwarz and writer Christina Schwarz claimed: "So widespread is the literary world's scorn for John O'Hara that the inclusion of Appointment in Samarra on the Modern Library's list of the 100 best English-language novels of the twentieth century was used to ridicule the entire project." The endings of some of O'Hara's novels and stories are clumsy, hasty conclusions. Some of the criticism of O'Hara's writing is attributed to dislike of O'Hara personally because of his abrasive ego and lack of humility in dealing with others, his vigorous self-promotion, his obsession with his social status, and the politically conservative columns he wrote late in his career. Early and mid 20th century critics also disparaged his novels for their blunt and non-judgmental depictions of loose women and homosexuals, yet critics writing after the sexual revolution see in O'Hara a pioneer in depicting female sexuality in frank, realistic ways. His most biting critics regard his novels to be shallow and overly concerned with sexual desire, drinking and surface details at the expense of deeper meaning. Many leading characters in O'Hara's novels are alcoholics who live as emotional zombies, anesthetized by drinking and unable to ponder the human heart in conflict with itself. As his contemporary William Faulkner said of such writers in his Nobel Prize address of 1949, "He writes not of the heart but of the glands."

In 1949, O'Hara left The New Yorker bitterly, after his colleague Brendan Gill shocked literary circles with a brutally devastating review in The New Yorker of O'Hara's long novel A Rage to Live. Gill disparaged O'Hara's book as "a formula family novel" turned out by "writers of the third and fourth magnitude in such disheartening abundance" and declared it "a catastrophe" by an author who "plainly intended to write nothing less than a great American novel." Literary critics called Gill's review a "savage attack" and a "cruel hatchet job" on one of The New Yorkers most popular writers. "During the preceding two decades O'Hara had been The New Yorker's most prolific contributor of stories" (no fewer than 197 by one count). After the magazine published Gill's review, O'Hara quit writing for The New Yorker for more than a decade, and when readers complained to Gill for driving O'Hara away, Gill deflected blame onto another New Yorker contributor, James Thurber, for stirring up animosity. O'Hara would not resume writing for The New Yorker until the 1960s, upon the arrival of a new editor who sought out O'Hara with an olive branch. Nearly 50 years after the scandalous review, at a forum on O'Hara's legacy held in 1996, Gill stood up in the crowd to explain his attack on O'Hara, rationalizing his actions by pleading, "I had to tell the truth about the novel."

O'Hara's legacy has many literary heavyweight admirers, including authors Updike and Shelby Foote. Fans admire O'Hara for his deft ability to depict realistic dialogue, his mastery of the telling detail and his sharp eye for the way humans communicate in nonverbal ways—from subtle glances to telling gestures. McGrath, a former fiction editor of The New Yorker and former editor of The New York Times Book Review, has called O'Hara "one of the great listeners of American fiction, able to write dialogue that sounded the way people really talk, and he also learned the eavesdropper's secret—how often people leave unsaid what is really on their minds.". O'Hara said he learned from reading Ring Lardner "that if you wrote down speech as it is spoken truly, you produce true characters," and added, "Sometimes I almost feel that I ought to apologize for having the ability to write good dialogue, and yet it's the attribute most lacking in American writers and almost totally lacking in the British."

According to biographer Frank MacShane, O'Hara thought that Hemingway's death made O'Hara the leading candidate for the Nobel Prize in Literature. O'Hara wrote to his daughter "I really think I will get it," and "I want the Nobel prize... so bad I can taste it." MacShane says that T.S. Eliot told O'Hara that he had, in fact, been nominated twice. When John Steinbeck won the prize in 1962, O'Hara wired, "Congratulations, I can think of only one other author I'd rather see get it." In a letter to Steinbeck two years before that, O'Hara placed himself with Steinbeck in the pantheon of great 20th century American writers, Hemingway, Fitzgerald and Faulkner, singling out Faulkner among them as "the one, the genius."

Death
O'Hara died from cardiovascular disease in Princeton, New Jersey, and is interred in the Princeton Cemetery. A comment he made about himself and which was chosen by his wife for his epitaph reads: "Better than anyone else, he told the truth about his time. He was a professional. He wrote honestly and well." Of this, Gill commented: "From the far side of the grave, he remains self-defensive and overbearing. Better than anyone else? Not merely better than any other writer of fiction but better than any dramatist, any poet, any biographer, any historian? It is an astonishing claim."

After his death, O'Hara's study and its contents were reconstructed in 1974 for display at Pennsylvania State University, where his papers are held. His childhood home, the John O'Hara House in Pottsville, was added to the National Register of Historic Places in 1978.

Adaptations

O'Hara's epistolary novel Pal Joey (1940) led to the successful Broadway musical, with libretto by O'Hara and songs by Rodgers and Hart. In 1957, Pal Joey was made into a musical film starring Rita Hayworth, Frank Sinatra, Kim Novak, and Barbara Nichols.

From the Terrace is a 1960 film adapted from O'Hara's 1958 novel of the same title. The film starred Paul Newman as disenchanted Alfred Eaton, son of a wealthy but indifferent father and alcoholic mother as well as Joanne Woodward as his socially ambitious, self-pitying and unfaithful wife Mary St. John.

Also in 1960, O'Hara's best-selling 1935 novel BUtterfield 8 was released as a film with the same name. Elizabeth Taylor won the Academy Award for Best Actress for her portrayal of Gloria Wandrous. Of the film version, Taylor famously said, "I think it stinks."

Ten North Frederick is a 1958 film based on O'Hara's 1955 novel of the same title. Gary Cooper starred as Joe Chapin, with Diane Varsi, Suzy Parker and Geraldine Fitzgerald in supporting roles. O'Hara called Cooper's performance "sensitive, understanding and true."

A Rage to Live is a 1965 film directed by Walter Grauman and starring Suzanne Pleshette as Grace Caldwell Tate, a well-mannered, uppercrust beauty whose passions wreak havoc on multiple lives. The screenplay by John T. Kelley is based on O'Hara's best-selling 1949 novel of the same name.

O'Hara's short stories about Gibbsville were used as the basis for the 1975 NBC television movie John O'Hara's Gibbsville (also known as The Turning Point of Jim Malloy) and for the short-lived 1976 NBC dramatic television series Gibbsville.

In 1987, an adaptation of O'Hara's 1966 story "Natica Jackson," about a film actress in 1930s Hollywood, was produced for the PBS anthology series Great Performances. It was directed by Paul Bogart and starred Michelle Pfeiffer in the title role.

The television period drama series Mad Men which aired on cable channel AMC from 2007 to 2015 generated renewed popular interest in O'Hara's work for the window it opens on the same themes in mid-20th century American life.

Columns
In the early 1950s, O'Hara wrote a weekly book column, "Sweet and Sour" for the Trenton Times-Advertiser and a biweekly column, "Appointment with O'Hara", for Collier's magazine. MacShane calls them "garrulous and outspoken" and says neither "added much of importance to O'Hara's work". Biographer Shelden Grebstein says that O'Hara in these columns was "simultaneously embarrassing and infuriating in his vaingloriousness, vindictiveness, and general bellicosity." Biographer Geoffrey Woolf says these earlier columns anticipated "his disastrous 'My Turn' in Newsday, which endured fifty-three weeks ... beginning in late 1964... of his dismissive and contemptuous worst".

His first Newsday column opened with the line, "Let's get off to a really bad start." His second complained, "the same hysteria that afflicted the Prohibitionists is now evident among the anti-cigarettists." His third column nominally supported the Republican Party nominee Barry Goldwater for U.S. president by identifying his cause with fans of the corny accordionist and band leader Lawrence Welk. "I think it's time the Lawrence Welk people had their say," wrote O'Hara. "The Lester Lanin and Dizzy Gillespie people have been on too long. When the country is in trouble, like war kind of trouble, man, it is the Lawrence Welk people who can be depended upon, all the way." In his fifth column, he argued that Martin Luther King Jr. should not have received the Nobel Peace Prize.

The syndicated column was not a success, published by a continuously decreasing number of newspapers, and did not endear him to the politically liberal New York literary establishment.

Several of his columns demonstrate his knowledge of trivia about and yearning for association with Ivy League colleges. As he noted, "Through the years I have acquired a vast amount of information about colleges and universities." The May 8, 1965 column takes as its ostensible topic the fact that Yale owns stock in American Broadcasting Company and thus is a beneficiary of the television program Peyton Place. O'Hara writes: 

Later, he notes that James Gould Cozzens is a "genuine Harvard alumnus" and speculates that Harvard should broker a television serialization of a Cozzens novel:

His September 4, 1965 column deals entirely with his failure to have received any honorary degrees, going into detail about three honorary degrees he was actually offered but, for various reasons, did not accept. In the column, he lists the awards he has received:

He complains that the colleges write him "highly complimentary" letters asking him to perform "chores" such as officiating as writer-in-residence, judging literary contests, and give lectures, yet do not give him degree citations. "The five major distinctions," he notes, "were awarded me by other writers, not by [academia]."

The column closes with the comment:

Bibliography

Novels
 Appointment in Samarra (1934)
 BUtterfield 8 (1935)
 Hope of Heaven (1938)
 Pal Joey (1940)
 A Rage to Live (1949)
 The Farmers Hotel (1951) — adapted from O'Hara's original play
 Ten North Frederick (1955) — winner of the National Book Award for Fiction
 A Family Party (1956)
 From the Terrace (1958)
 Ourselves to Know (1960)
 The Big Laugh (1962)
 Elizabeth Appleton (1963)
 The Lockwood Concern (1965)
 The Instrument (1967)
 Lovey Childs: A Philadelphian's Story (1969)
 The Ewings (1970)
 The Second Ewings (1972)

Short story collections
 The Doctor’s Son and Other Stories (1935)
 Files on Parade (1939)
 Pipe Night (1945)
 Hellbox (1947)
 Sermons and Soda Water: A Trilogy of Three Novellas (1960)
 Assembly (1961)
 The Cape Cod Lighter (1962)
 The Hat on the Bed (1963)
 The Horse Knows the Way (1964)
 Waiting for Winter (1966)
 And Other Stories (1968)
 The Time Element and Other Stories (1972)
 Good Samaritan and Other Stories (1974)
 Gibbsville, PA (Carroll & Graf, 1992)

Screenplays
 He Married His Wife (1940)
 Moontide (1942)

Plays
 Five Plays (1961)
(The Farmers Hotel,
The Searching Sun,
The Champagne Pool,
Veronique,
The Way It Was)
 Two by O'Hara (1979)
(The Man Who Could Not Lose [screen treatment] and Far from Heaven [play])

Nonfiction
 Sweet and Sour (1954) Assorted columns on books and authors
 My Turn (1966). Fifty-three weekly columns written for Newsday
 Letters (1978).

Other
BUtterfield 8, Pal Joey and The Doctor's Son and Other Stories were published as Armed Services Editions during WWII.

References

Further reading
 Gill, Brendan. Here at The New Yorker. Random House, 1975. Da Capo Press, 1997, . (O'Hara desperately wanting to attend Yale, p. 117. Failure to get honorary Yale degree, p. 268.)
 O'Hara, John (1966), My Turn: Fifty-three Pieces by John O'Hara (collected newspaper columns), Random House.
 Farr, Finis (1973): O'Hara: A Biography. Boston: Little Brown.
 Bruccoli, Matthew J. (1975): The O'Hara Concern: A Biography of John O'Hara. New York: Random House.
 MacShane, Frank (1980): The Life of John O'Hara. New York: Dutton.
 Woolf, Geoffrey (2003): The Art of Burning Bridges: A Life of John O'Hara. New York: Knopf.
 The Western Canon: Appointment in Samarra included by Harold Bloom.

External links

 Philly Burbs O'Hara's lost papers and reward
 John O'Hara – (1905–1970)
 O'Hara Study at Penn State
 Guide to the John O'Hara Papers, 1923–1991
 Guide to the Random House Files of John O'Hara, 1927–1977
 Calendar of the John O'Hara Letters to H. N. Swanson, 1955–1970.
 
 
 
John O'Hara Papers. Yale Collection of American Literature, Beinecke Rare Book and Manuscript Library.

1905 births
1970 deaths
20th-century American novelists
American columnists
American male novelists
American male screenwriters
American male journalists
National Book Award winners
People from Pottsville, Pennsylvania
The New Yorker people
Niagara University alumni
Novelists from Pennsylvania
American male short story writers
American people of Irish descent
20th-century American short story writers
Journalists from Pennsylvania
20th-century American male writers
20th-century American non-fiction writers
Screenwriters from Pennsylvania
Screenwriters from New York (state)
Burials at Princeton Cemetery
20th-century American screenwriters
20th-century American journalists
Members of the American Academy of Arts and Letters